The 1983 Men's European Volleyball Championship was the thirteenth edition of the event, organized by Europe's governing volleyball body, the Confédération Européenne de Volleyball. It was hosted in several cities in East Germany from September 17 to September 25, 1983.

Teams

Group A – Erfurt

Group B – Suhl

Group C – East Berlin

Preliminary round

Final round

Final ranking

References
 Results

Men's European Volleyball Championships
E
V
Volleyball
Volleyball Championship
International volleyball competitions hosted by Germany
Volleyball in East Germany
Men's European Volleyball Championship